Frances R. Jones (May 18, 1911 – ?) was a state legislator in Pennsylvania. She served in the Pennsylvania House of Representatives, succeeding her husband in 1950 and was re-elected at least four times. A Democrat, she served from 1959 to 1966.

She was born in Mt. Holly Springs, Pennsylvania.

References

20th-century American women politicians
Date of death missing
1911 births
20th-century American politicians
Democratic Party members of the Pennsylvania House of Representatives
Women state legislators in Pennsylvania
People from Cumberland County, Pennsylvania